Didymozoidae is a family of flatworms belonging to the order Plagiorchiida.

Genera

Genera:
 Adenodidymocystis Yamaguti, 1970 
 Allodidymocodium Yamaguti, 1970 
 Allometanematobothrioides Yamaguti, 1965

References

Platyhelminthes